Top Sergeant Mulligan is a 1941 American comedy film directed by Jean Yarbrough and written by Edmond Kelso. The film stars Nat Pendleton, Carol Hughes, Sterling Holloway, Marjorie Reynolds, Tom Neal, Frank Faylen and Charlie Hall. The film was released on October 17, 1941, by Monogram Pictures.

Plot
Pat and Budd are sick of being harassed and running away from bill collector Herman Mulligan, so they decide to enlist in the army. All seems good until they arrive at the bootcamp and discover that their platoon's Top Sergeant is Herman Mulligan. Mulligan takes advantage of this situation and makes their life hard.

Cast          
Nat Pendleton as Top Sergeant Herman Mulligan
Carol Hughes as Avis
Sterling Holloway as Frank Snark
Marjorie Reynolds as Gail Nash
Tom Neal as Don Lewis
Frank Faylen as Pat Dolan
Charlie Hall as Budd Doolittle
Betty Blythe as Mrs. Lewis
Dick Elliott as Mr. Lewis
Maynard Holmes as Briggs
Wonderful Smith as Wonderful Smith

References

External links
 

1941 films
1940s English-language films
American comedy films
1941 comedy films
Monogram Pictures films
Films directed by Jean Yarbrough
American black-and-white films
1940s American films